Fannie Charles Dillon (March 16, 1881February 21, 1947) was an American pianist, music educator and composer.

Life
Fannie Charles Dillon was born in Denver, Colorado in 1881. She moved with her family to Long Beach, California in 1890. She studied composition with Heinrich Urban, Hugo Kaun and Rubin Goldmark, and piano with Leopold Godowsky in Berlin.

Personal life and marriage
After completing her studies, Dillon worked as a pianist, teacher, performer and composer in Los Angeles. She taught at Pomona College from 1910 to 1913 and in the Los Angeles high school system from 1918 to 1941. She founded Woodland Theater at Fawnskin, Big Bear Lake, California, in 1924 and served as its general manager from 1926 to 1929. She married Cypriot theater actor James Christo. Dillon died in Altadena, California. Her papers are stored by the UCLA library.

As a composer, Dillon was known for adapting bird calls into her scores. While she was teaching at Los Angeles High School in the late 1920s, future composer John Cage was among her students.

Works
Dillon composed for piano, voice, orchestra and chamber ensemble, as well as for outdoor dramas. Selected works include:
Nevertheless--Old Glory, drama
The desert calls, drama
Tahquitz, drama (see Tahquitz (spirit))
Celebration of Victory, for orchestra
The Cloud, for orchestra
Woodland Flute Call, for organ
A Letter from the Southland: Mission Garden
The Alps
Chinese Symphonic Suite

References

External links
Birds At Dawn - Fannie Charles Dillon from YouTube

1881 births
1947 deaths
20th-century classical composers
20th-century American composers
20th-century women composers
20th-century American women musicians
American classical composers
American women classical composers
American music educators
American women music educators
Pomona College faculty
Burials at Forest Lawn Memorial Park (Glendale)
American women academics